Ercole III d'Este (Ercole Rinaldo; 22 November 1727 – 14 October 1803) was Duke of Modena and Reggio from 1780 to 1796, and later of Breisgau (not resident). He was a member of the House of Este.

Biography

He was born in Modena, the son of Duke Francesco III d'Este, Duke of Modena and Charlotte Aglaé d'Orléans, daughter of Philippe d'Orléans, Duke of Orléans and Regent of France. He was the couple's fourth child and had an older sister Maria Teresa and two brothers who died before his birth. 

In 1741, he married Maria Teresa Cybo-Malaspina, heir and, from 1780, sovereign of the Duchy of Massa and Carrara: their relations turned out to be extremely unhappy and the Duchess lived for most of the time in Reggio, separated from her husband. When his parents succeeded as rulers of Modena, he was styled His Royal Highness the Hereditary Prince of Modena (1737–1780) and after 1780, His Royal Highness the Duke of Modena. 

Generally appreciated by his subjects (he sometimes spoke in Modenese dialect with them), and continued the reform begun by his father. He built the two bridges at Rubiera and St. Ambrogio at Modena on the Via Emilia, and built new roads connecting to the neighbouring states. In 1785 he founded the Atesine Academy of Fine Arts: during his reign arts and culture flourished, and among his protegées were Lazzaro Spallanzani, Giambattista Venturi, Girolamo Tiraboschi, Lodovico Ricci and others.

After the death of his wife in 1790, he married morganatically in 1795 with his long-time mistress Chiara Marini (d. Treviso, 1800), whom he invested with title of Marchioness of Scandiano (only formally, without any authentic rule over this land).

The French invasion forced him to flee to Venice on 7 May 1796, carrying with him a conspicuous personal asset. Later French soldiers captured him at Venice, robbing 200,000 zecchini from his house. After this episode he moved to Treviso, where he died in 1803. The peaces of Treaty of Campo Formio (1797) and Lunéville had assigned him territories in Breisgau in exchange of the lost Duchy, but he never took possession of them.

His only legitimate daughter Maria Beatrice married Archduke Ferdinand of Austria. Their son Francis IV regained the Duchy of Modena and Reggio in 1814.

Issue

Maria Beatrice d'Este (7 April 1750 – 14 November 1829), married Archduke Ferdinand of Austria and had issue.
Rinaldo Francesco d'Este (4 January 1753 – 5 May 1753), died in infancy.
Ercole Rinaldo (1770 – 16 February 1795), created Marquess of Scandiano in 1787, General in the Modena Army (died illegitimate, before the marriage of their parents).

Ancestry

Notes

External links

1727 births
1803 deaths
Hereditary Princes of Modena
Ercole 3
Ercole 3
Ercole 3
Ercole 3
18th-century Italian people
Ercole 3
Generals of the Holy Roman Empire